Poulnabrone dolmen (Poll na Brón in Irish) is an unusually large dolmen or portal tomb located in the Burren, County Clare, Ireland. Situated on one of the most desolate and highest points of the region, it comprises three standing portal stones supporting a heavy horizontal capstone, and dates to the Neolithic period, probably between 4200 BC and 2900 BC. It is the best known and most widely photographed of the approximately 172 dolmens in Ireland.

The karst setting has been formed from limestone laid down around 350 million years ago. The dolmen was built by Neolithic farmers, who chose the location either for ritual, as a territorial marker, or as a collective burial site. What remains today is only the "stone skeleton" of the original monument; originally it would have been covered with soil, and its flagstone capped by a cairn. 

When the site was said to be excavated in 1986 and again in 1988 but no photographic evidence of this is available, around 33 human remains, including those of adults, children (and the remains of a much later Bronze Age infant) were found buried underneath it, along with various stone and bone objects that would have been placed with them at the time of interment. Both the human remains and the burial objects date to between 3800 BC and 3200 BC.

Name
Poulnabrone is an English phonetic transcription of Irish Poll na Brón. Brón is the genitive case of Irish word bró, meaning quern, so the name means  "Hole (or Pool) of the Quernstone". It is sometimes wrongly translated as "Hole of Sorrows" (Poll na mBrón).

Location and purpose
Poulnabrone dolmen is situated in a rocky and unblemished field in the remote and high altitude townland of Poulnabrone, Kilcorney, close to the R480 road, 8 km south of Ballyvaughan.  It is well outside the boundaries of the Burren National Park, contrary to some information sources suggesting otherwise. Its location would have been difficult of access at the time it was built, and it was probably used as a centre for ritual until well into the Bronze Age, with evidence that it was in use even into the early medieval Celtic era. It may have served also as a territorial marker in the Neolithic landscape, in a significant position widely visible from all around and close to the important north-south route from Ballyvaughan Bay south to the region where Kilnaboy now stands. It is possible that the inhabitants of the settlements near what is now Kilnaboy erected the structure to delimit the northern border of their territory, though it was also used for burials.

Design 

Poulnabrone is the largest Irish portal tomb after Brownshill Dolmen in County Carlow. It is located on the remains of a mound, and consists of slab-like tabular capstone which is thirteen feet in length (around 4 metres), 2 metres (6 ft) to 3 metres (10 ft) wide and 30 cm (1 ft) thick. Unusually for dolmens of this type, the capstone slopes towards the west. The chamber's "roof" formed by this huge capstone is supported by two sets of slender upright parallel portal stones and orthostats (upright slabs), each about 2 metres (5 to 7 feet) high, which mark the entrance, and support the capstone from the ground, creating a chamber that tapers eastwards. Its cairn on average extends for 3 metres from the chamber. 

The upright stones stabilise the chamber and, as they are placed directly on the limestone bedrock, would have been no higher during the Neolithic period. The entrance faces north, and is crossed by a low sill stone, which is positioned on an east-west crevice. Three stones just before the sill stone form an antechamber backfilled with earth and stones. 

Radiocarbon dating indicates that the tomb was probably in use as a burial site between 3,800 and 3,200 BC. The findings are now at the Clare Museum, Ennis, loaned from the National Museum of Ireland.

Excavations 

A spiral crack on the eastern portal stone was discovered by a local in 1985. As the crack was thought likely to destabilise the tomb, two phases of conservation were undertaken, both overseen by Dr. Ann Lynch, Senior Irish Government Archaeologist at the National Monuments Service. The dolmen was dismantled, and the cracked stone replaced during excavations in 1986 and 1988.

Human remains
The remains of around 33 people were found buried underneath the monument. All but one of the adults were under the age of 30. They lived between 3800 and 3200 BC, and can be assumed to have been members of a specific elite. In June 2020, the earliest incidence of Down syndrome was found in genomic evidence from an infant that was buried before 3200 BC under the monument. Personal items buried found along with them include a stone axe, jewelry made from bone and quartz crystals, weapons and pottery. The fact that none of the skeletons was intact  led to the conclusion that the site was not intended as an ongoing burial place: instead, the bodies were jumbled chronologically, rather than having been buried sequentially - although they were all found in the original strata. It was often difficult, or impossible, to distinguish the remains of each individual, or even establish their sex. Only one adult seems to have lived past 40. 

Many of the bones showed signs of arthritis in the upper body, and the children's teeth showed evidence of illness and malnutrition. In most cases, the pathology and physical condition of the remains indicated lives spent in hard physical labour, and a life-span that ended before the age of 30, despite the theory that these were apparently high-ranking individuals. Two of the bodies show proof of major injuries: a skull and rib cage with depressed fractures, healed before death, and an adult male hip bone, pierced by the tip of a stone projectile and not healed, which means the injury occurred not much before the time of death. The bodies had been left elsewhere to decompose - in a protected location, as none of the bones show any signs of animal teeth marks. Only the bare bones were then taken here and deposited. As some of them show scorch marks, they may have been ritually purified by fire beforehand.

During the Bronze Age (c. 1750 to 1420 BC), i.e. very much later, a newborn baby was buried in the portico, just outside the entrance.

Tourism and preservation
The site is relatively unblemished, despite being a popular tourist attraction. A rope provides a barrier between tourists and the dolmen in order to preserve the ancient stone, and it is requested that tourists do not go beyond this barrier or touch the dolmen.

A large car park was opened in 2007 by the Clare County Council to deal with traffic problems caused by cars or coaches parking in the narrow road, guided by a  2005 estimate that put the number of annual visitors at 200,000. In 2007, tension arose when Dr. Ann Lynch, the archaeologist who led the excavation of the site, requested that visitor facilities should be reduced in order to preserve "the spiritual quality of the landscape surrounding the tomb."

References

Notes

Sources

 Carthy, Hugh. Burren Archaeology. Cork: The Collins Press, 2011. 
 Cunningham, George. Burren Journey. Shannonside Mid Western Regional Tourism Organisation, 1978. ASIN: B000GUBTOK
 Lynch, Ann. Poulnabrone: An Early Neolithic Portal Tomb in Ireland. Dublin: Wordwell Books, 2014. 
 Lynch, Ann. "Poulnabrone: A Stone in Time". Archaeology Ireland, Volume 2, No. 3, 1988. pp. 105-107. 
 Weir, Anthony. Early Ireland: A Field Guide. Belfast: Blackstaff Press, 1980

External links

 Poulnabrone dolmen at Clare County Library
 Poulnabrone dolmen at The Modern Antiquarian
 The History of Poulnabrone at the Irish Archaeology website

Archaeological sites in County Clare
Dolmens in Ireland
National Monuments in County Clare
Tombs in the Republic of Ireland